Dark Sarah is a Finnish symphonic metal band created by Heidi Parviainen, after her departure from Finnish metal band Amberian Dawn in 2012. Their style is often described as "cinematic metal".

History

Formation and creation of Behind the Black Veil (2012–2015)
Vocalist Heidi Parviainen started working on Dark Sarah's debut album Behind the Black Veil after having made the decision to leave her former band Amberian Dawn. When writing her first lyrics for the song "Save Me", which is about a character named Sarah, who is left at the altar by her fiancé, and runs off into the woods in tears, she eventually decided to make a concept album which would be about the dark side of Sarah. It was also then that she came up with the name of her project.
To bring her project to the attention of audience, she asked musicians Kasperi Heikkinen, Teemu Laitinen and Jukka Koskinen to record the first two songs "Save Me" and "Poison Apple" for what would turn out into Dark Sarah's debut album Behind the Black Veil.

To finance the whole project, three separate Indiegogo campaigns were started, which all received full funding by the fans. The cd would be recorded into three parts, called episodes, the first episode containing the first four tracks, the second tracks 5 to 8, and the third tracks 9 to 14. For promotional purposes the EP Violent Roses, which contained episodes 1 and 2, went on sale during Metal Female Voices Fest 2014. Only 250 copies were pressed, and all were signed by the then live line up.

In the meantime the rest of the recordings for Behind the Black Veil continued. On 27 September 2012 it was announced that Manuela Kraller (ex-Xandria) would participate in a duet for the song "Memories Fall", as the Fate character. Two more collaborations were announced later on as well, on 13 January 2013 that of Inga Scharf (character Queen of No Good) and Stefan Schmidt from German metal band Van Canto for the song "Evil Roots", and on 29 August 2014 that of Tony Kakko (character The Moon) from Finnish metal band Sonata Arctica for the song "Light in You". Parviainen completed the lyrics with the help of Emy Frost, Janne Storm and Perttu Vänskä, and the music with Frost, Storm, Mikko P. Mustonen and Stefan Schmidt. Guitarists Sami Salonen and Erkka Korhonen, drummer Lauri Kuussalo and bass player Jukka Koskinen were added to the official line up of Dark Sarah, which now had turned into a live band, with Parviainen remaining the main figure. On the way, bass player Jukka Koskinen left, and was replaced by Rude Rothstén, while on 29 April 2015 it was announced that drummer Lauri Kussaloit had left Dark Sarah to be able to concentrate more on his own music, and was replaced by Thomas Tunkkari. Video's for the songs "Memories Fall" (feat. Manuela Kraller), "Hunting the Dreamer" and "Light in You" (feat. Tony Kakko) were released.

The Puzzle (2015–2017)
On 16 December 2015 Parviainen announced through her Facebook page that recordings for the first songs of the next album had started. On 6 March 2016 the first teaser was released together with the title of the new album, which would be named The Puzzle. The story of the album is going to continue from where it ended on the previous album. Parviainen explains it as: "The Puzzle is a concept album and it continues the story that started on the debut album called Behind the Black Veil. After the evil tree had died and Dark Sarah's soul with it, she was sent to drift along the river of death. The streams took her on an island where the banished souls are taken to. To get off the island she needs to solve the puzzle and find three keys." 
Once again an indiegogo campaign started to finance the album, this time without several episodes. Full funding was reached at the end of the campaign.
The first video for the song of the album "Little Men" was released on 15 April 2016. On 24 April Parviainen revealed on her Facebook page that once again three guests would perform on the new album. Manuela Kraller returns as her character Fate on the song "Rain", and Juha-Pekka Leppäluoto (Charon, Northern Kings) plays the character The Dragon on the song "Dance with the Dragon". On the 13 September the third guest was announced, Charlotte Wessels (Delain, Phantasma) plays the character Evil Siren Mermaid on the song "Aquarium", along with the information that The Puzzle would have been released in Europe and North America on 18 November. On 18 October a lyric video from the song "Aquarium" was released.

The Golden Moth (2017–present)
In March 2017, it was announced that a third album was in the works, with JP Leppäluoto returning to reprise his role as The Dragon, as well as join the band lineup and compose music for the album together with Parviainen. Another crowdfunding campaign to raise money for a new music video was also announced. The description on the crowdfunding page read;
"The concept of Dark Sarah is built around a story that tells about a young woman called Sarah and her fight against her evil side persona Dark Sarah. The albums tell a story about her journey through three worlds - The Middle World, the world of living (Behind The Black Veil album) and The Under World, where the dead dwell (The Puzzle album) and The Upper World, where spirits and gods reside."
The new album was also described as a continuation of the story of Dark Sarah and The Dragon (the ruler of the Underworld), who meet again in The Upper World. On 26 October the next Indiegogo campaign started, which reached full funds on 14 December. Along with it came the title of the new album, The Golden Moth, and a new music video for the song "Trespasser". On 2 November, singer Zuberoa Aznárez from Spanish metal band Diabulus in Musica was revealed as the first new guest on the album as the fierce goddess Iron Mask on Dark Sarah's Facebook page. Later on 3 December the other two guests were revealed, singer and bassplayer Marko Hietala from Finnish metal band Nightwish as the god White Beard and accordion player Netta Skog from the Finnish metal band Ensiferum as an accordion playing Fortune Teller.

Band members

Current members
 Heidi Parviainen — vocals (2012–present)
 Sami Salonen — guitars (2014–present)
 Thomas Tunkkari — drums (2015–present)
 Rude Rothstén — bass (2014–present)
 Henrik Airaksinen - synth & keys (2022-present)

Former members
 Jukka Koskinen — bass (2014)
 Lauri Kuussalo — drums (2014–2015)
Juha-Pekka Leppäluoto — vocals (2017–2019)
 Erkka Korhonen — guitars (2014–2021)

Session musicians
Behind the Black Veil:
 Kasperi Heikkinen (guitars on "Save Me" and "Poison Apple")
 Manuela Kraller (as the character Fate on "Memories Fall")
 Inga Scharf (as the character Queen of No Good on "Evil Roots")
 Van Canto (backing vocals on "Evil Roots")
 Tuomas Nieminen (backing vocals on "Silver Tree" and "Light in You")
 Tony Kakko (as the character The Moon on "Light in You")

The Puzzle:
 Juha-Pekka Leppäluoto (as the character The Dragon on "Dance with the Dragon")
 Charlotte Wessels (as the character Evil Siren Mermaid on "Aquarium")
 Manuela Kraller (as the character Fate on "Rain")

The Golden Moth:
 Zuberoa Aznárez (as the character Iron Mask)
 Marko Hietala (as the character White Beard)
 Netta Skog (as the character Fortune Teller)
 Juha-Pekka Leppäluoto (as the character The Dragon)

Grim:
 Juha-Pekka Leppäluoto (as the character The Dragon/Garmr the Wolf)
 Jasse Jatala (as the character Mörk)

Timeline

Discography
Studio albums
 Behind the Black Veil (2015)
 The Puzzle (2016)
 The Golden Moth (2018)
 Grim (2020)
 Attack of Orym (2023)

EPs
 Violent Roses (2014)

Music videos
 "Save Me" (2013)
 "Memories Fall" (2014)
 "Hunting the Dreamer" (2014)
 "Light in You" (2015)
 "Little Men" (2016)
 "Aquarium" (lyric video) (2016)
 "Dance with the Dragon" (2016)
 "Trespasser" (2017)
 "Gods Speak" (lyric video) (2018)
 "Sky Sailing" (2018)
 "Golden Moth" (2018)
 "Melancholia" (2020)
 "All Ears" (2020)
 "Illuminate" (2020)

References

Finnish symphonic metal musical groups
Finnish gothic metal musical groups
Musical groups established in 2012
Napalm Records artists
2012 establishments in Finland